Carlo Marrale (born 15 March 1952 in Genoa), is an Italian singer, songwriter and musician.

Early career and Jet 
In 1971 Marrale founded in Genoa, with fellow musicians Piero Cassano and Aldo Stellita, the progressive rock band Jet, in which he acted as a guitarist and main vocalist. The band released an album, Fede, speranza, carità and unsuccessfully participated to the Sanremo Music Festival 1973 with the song Anika na-o.

Matia Bazar 
In 1975, vocalist Antonella Ruggiero and drummer Giancarlo Golzi joined Jet, resulting in a new band: Matia Bazar. Apart from writing most of the music for the band, Marrale performed as a singer in many instances, duetting with Ruggiero in several early hits of the group, such as Stasera...che sera! (1975), Per un'ora d'amore (1975), Cavallo bianco (1975), Solo tu (1977), Raggio di luna (1979), C'è tutto un mondo intorno (1979), then providing his vocals less frequently until the band's last album with Ruggiero, Red Corner (1989).

After Ruggiero's departure from Matia Bazar in 1989, Marrale resumed his role as male vocalist duetting with the band's new lead singer Laura Valente in the band's Sanremo hits Piccoli giganti (1992) and Dedicato a te (1993).

Solo career and other activities 
In late 1993, Marrale left Matia Bazar to pursue a solo career. In 1994 he participated, somewhat unsuccessfully, to the Sanremo Music Festival with L'ascensore, before releasing his first solo album Tra le dita la vita.

He also wrote songs for international artists like Irene Cara, Miguel Bosé, Mina, Pet Shop Boys, Queensrÿche; his track Odissea for the album Duetto (2003) by renowned tenors Salvatore Licitra and Marcelo Álvarez peaked at No. 1 on the US charts.

In November 2007, Marrale released his second solo album, Melody Maker, including the track Controtendenza, with a videoclip by artist Vince Ricotta.

Alongside his career in the music industry, Marrale is also a painter and a photographer.

Discography

With Jet
 Fede, speranza, carità (1972)

With Matia Bazar
 Matia Bazar 1 (1976)
 Gran Bazar (1977)
 Semplicità (1978)
 Tournée (1979)
 Il tempo del sole (1980)
 Berlino, Parigi, Londra (1982)
 Tango (1983)
 Aristocratica (1984)
 Melanchòlia (1985)
 Melò (1987)
 Red Corner (1989)
 Anime pigre (1991)
 Dove le canzoni si avverano (1993)

Solo
 Tra le dita la vita (1994)
 Melody Maker (2007)

Notes

External links
 

1952 births
Musicians from Genoa
20th-century Italian male singers
21st-century Italian male singers
21st-century Italian musicians
Italian singer-songwriters
Living people
Italian guitarists